Wesley Koolhof and Matwé Middelkoop were the defending champions but chose not to defend their title.

Sander Gillé and Joran Vliegen won the title after defeating Jozef Kovalík and Stefanos Tsitsipas 6–2, 4–6, [12–10] in the final.

Seeds

Draw

References
 Main Draw

The Hague Open - Doubles
2017 Doubles